Vatan (Motherland) is a socio-political newspaper in the Judeo-Tat and Russian languages. The newspaper covers the social and political events taking place in Dagestan, Russia, and also publishes materials on the history and culture of the Mountain Jews. 

Founded in 1928 under the name - "The Toiler". Asail Binaev became the first editor. Initially, the newspaper was printed in the Hebrew alphabet. In 1929-1930 it switched to the Latin alphabet, and in 1938 - to the Cyrillic alphabet, which is still used today. In the middle of 1938, the newspaper received a new name: - "Red Star". In the late 1940s, the newspaper was discontinued. The newspaper renewed work in 1975. In 1991 the name of the newspaper was changed to "Vatan".

In the 1930s, the Mountain Jewish poet Daniil Atnilov 
worked for the newspaper.

References

External links 
Official website 
The next issue of the weekly newspaper "Vatan" has been released 
The new issue of the newspaper "Vatan" has been published
The newspaper "Vatan" is 25 years old!
Derbent newspaper "Vatan"
"Vatan" newspaper today
What they wrote in the newspaper "Vatan" in 1938
Mountain Jewish newspapers of the Soviet period

Judeo-Tat
Newspapers of Dagestan
Russian-language newspapers
Publications established in 1928
Jewish newspapers